Ergophobia (also referred to as ergasiophobia or ponophobia) is an abnormal and persistent fear of work (manual labor, non-manual labor, etc.) or fear of finding or losing employment. It is considered a form of social phobia or performance anxiety, as well as being recognised as a derivative of occupational burnout, derived from a persisting sense of pressure or excessive expectations in a workplace. 

People with ergophobia experience irrational anxiety about the work and the workplace environment. For example, fear of failing at assigned tasks, public speaking at the workplace (both of which are types of performance anxiety), socialising with co-workers (a specification of social phobia), and fear of emotional, psychological and/or physical injuries.

Ergophobia is not specifically defined in the DSM-5. However, the criteria for meeting this disorder can be found in the 'Specific Phobia' section of the manual. Specifically, the DSM-V lists seven criteria for diagnosis and additional specifiers depending on the theme of the phobia. Ergophobia meets one specifier as it is caused by a 'Situational' phobic stimulus. Specific phobias are often associated with a range of other mental health disorders: depressive disorder, anxiety disorder, bipolar disorders, substance abuse and personality disorders. There is a potential connection between executive dysfunction and work-related anxiety, as there is a known connection between dysfunction and general anxiety disorder, though there is not distinguishable evidence on which one causes the other.

The term ergophobia comes from the Greek "ergon" (work) and "phobos" (fear).

Phobias 
A phobia is a psychological condition in which an individual has a persisting fear of a situation or object that disproportionate to the threat they actually pose. This condition stems from one's need to constantly be alert and avoid the source of the phobia that results in of psychological distress. Phobias can be specific to a certain stimulus or general to social situations. The most effective treatment for phobias is exposure therapy.

Symptoms 
Ergophobia has both physical and psychological symptoms, such as anxiousness, fear and avoidance of the work environment. A study focused on burnout among teachers concluded that those experiencing ergophobia performed significantly worse on a physical health index compared to their colleagues. Physical symptoms can be caused by "burnout", including rapid heart rate, dry mouth, excessive sweating, general uneasiness, and panic attacks.

Common signs and symptoms of ergophobia includes:

 sweating
 racing heart rate or heart palpitations
 dry mouth
 feeling of suffocation or difficulty to breathe
 inability to meet work requirements
 panic attack
 difficulty keeping a job
 avoidance of taking on additional work responsibility
 ruminating on negative work situation or challenges at work
 disengagement from the workplace

History and measurement 
Historically, ergophobia has been dismissed as laziness. William Upson defined it as "the art of laziness" and "morbid fear or hatred of work". This publication  later found the name used by a hospital in New Jersey in the 1860s.  

Ergophobia is a corollary of occupational burnout, which is thought to be the result of long-term unresolvable job stress. The term "burnout" did not come to be used with regularity until the 1970s in the United States. Freudenberger, for example, used it to describe the phenomenon of physical and emotional exhaustion, with associated negative attitudes arising from intense interactions when working with people. Later studies on ergophobia and occupational burnout build upon the existing conception of Freudenberger’s research, and found the phenomenon was quite common in a variety of human service occupations. These occupations include health care and mental health care professionals, social welfare workers, lawyers, and business organization employees.

Although there is no formal diagnosis procedure, the Maslach Burnout Inventory – a series of introspective occupational burnout questions, is used together with the Areas of Worklife Survey (AWS) to assess levels of burnout. These tests measure emotional burnout, depersonalization, and personal achievements, and are suitable for both individual and group assessment.

Similar syndromes 
A similar syndrome is generalized anxiety disorder (GAD), where one experiences uncontrollably elevated levels of anxiety and worries over varying issues and events. As with phobia, individuals with GAD experience anxiety that is disproportionate to the actual threat a situation poses. Adults with GAD can feel stressed by work-related concerns regarding everyday tasks, evaluations, and presentations.

Social anxiety disorder, also known as social phobia, is characterized by feelings of anxiety induced by social interactions or situations, in which the individual may be scrutinized or rejected by others. This anxiety is easily exacerbated by work-related situations such as presentations, professional and friendly social interactions at the workplace.

Additionally, "Other specified Anxiety Disorder" also causes distress and significant levels of anxiety, but not in a manner that fully embodies the diagnostic symptoms of anxiety disorders. This disorder greatly influences performance in social, occupational or other important situations, therefore may seem similar to Ergophobia or occupational burnout.

In culture 
Ergophobia is being displayed and discussed in pop culture as suffering from occupational burnout. Being burnt-out is conceptualized as encompassing three components: emotional exhaustion, depersonalization, and reduced personal accomplishment. When people are seen as characteristically "burnt-out", their attitudes towards others change, becoming more cynical and retracted from normal social dynamics. Specifically, these traits are shown in two parts externally, emotional exhaustion refers to the feeling of being emotionally drained after interacting with other people, and depersonalization is expressed in negative attitudes or unsympathetic responses towards other people. When an individual perceives their sense of competence as lesser than their co-workers, or view their intelligence as greater than their colleagues who are being elevated to higher roles, there is a higher chance that their sense of personal accomplishment gets diminished.

A service-based economy has the potential to exacerbate emotional exhaustion as there are simply more people employed in this sector. Currently, 79.45 percent of people in the U.S are employed in the service industry.  Due to the fact that burnout or ergophobia is most commonly found in service sector roles, it is becoming a more prevalent issue in contemporary society.

The number of ergophobia cases increases with the number of people working in an ergophobia conducting environment, regardless of changes in the rates reported of ergophobia itself. The changing circumstances of employer-employee relations has also been significantly altered by this evolution to a service-based economy. Performance appraisal systems are now a popular tool within organizations to enhance employee commitment and productivity. Such system, in which the relationship between employee and boss is much closer, exacerbates emotional exhaustion among employees and subsequently feelings of ergophobia.

In recent years there has been a proliferation of mental health awareness discourses in popular Western culture. An example of such a mental-health-initiatives led by the private sphere, is the Canadian campaign, Bell Let’s Talk. Such worldwide and pervasive initiatives may, however, lead to misdiagnosis. As the fear of work itself is such a general catchall term, many may believe that they suffer from ergophobia when in fact the root issue is a plethora of other mental health issues such as Generalized Anxiety Disorder or social anxiety disorder.

Notes and references 

Phobias